Walk-Ikey Creek is a stream in the U.S. state of Georgia. It is a tributary to Ichawaynochaway Creek.

Walk-Ikey is a name derived from a Native American language meaning "cow creek".

References

Rivers of Georgia (U.S. state)
Rivers of Terrell County, Georgia